Andrew Shim (born 18 August 1983) is an American-born English actor best known for his appearances in the films and TV shows of Shane Meadows, especially This Is England (2006–2015). Although a United States citizen, he has lived most of his life in Britain since 1989.

Early life
Shim was born in Miami, Florida, United States to his African-American mother and Chinese father. He is of African-American and Chinese descent. When Shim was 6 years old, his family moved from United States to England in 1989. He started at Nottingham's Central Junior Television Workshop when he was 14. His sister, Shauna Shim, was already attending and, although not initially keen, before Shim joined with his grandmother. Shim was on the verge of leaving when he auditioned for a local film project to be directed by Shane Meadows. Repeated callbacks resulted in him being cast as the title character in A Room for Romeo Brass.

Career
Since starring as Romeo in A Room for Romeo Brass, Shim has appeared in subsequent Meadows' features Once Upon a Time in the Midlands (2002), Dead Man's Shoes (2004) and This Is England (2006) as well as the spin-off TV series This Is England '86 (2010), This Is England '88 (2011) and This Is England '90 (2015). He was also in the quarter-minute film "The Stairwell", which was Meadows' 2005 entry in the Nokia Shorts competition.

Additionally, Shim has appeared in several advertisements. He played a salesman in an Act On  commercial, and also appeared in an Orange Mobile advert which was filmed in Cape Town, South Africa. He played the role of Jamie in British prison film Screwed (2011) and played the character of Sam in Airborne starring Mark Hamill.

Personal life
Away from acting, Shim has a passion for sports cars and motorcycles. Having also worked for an IT software company, he regards himself as "a bit of an Arthur Daley", being quite successful at buying and selling used vehicles. He has stated that his dream car would be a black Lamborghini Murcielago Roadster. Shim is also an amateur mixed martial artist, competing in the featherweight division and training under Jim Wallhead and has also taken part in some motorcycle races.

On October 21, 2020, Shim was arrested in Málaga, Spain on drug trafficking charges. He was held on remand in Alhaurin de la Torre prison awaiting sentencing. In July 2021, Shim was given a suspended sentence and was released.

Filmography

Films

Television

References

External links

1983 births
American emigrants to England
American male actors of Chinese descent
American male film actors
American male mixed martial artists
American male television actors
American sportspeople of Chinese descent
English male film actors
English male mixed martial artists
English male television actors
English people of African-American descent
English people of Chinese descent
Featherweight mixed martial artists
Living people
Male actors from Miami
Male actors from Nottinghamshire
Prisoners and detainees of Spain
Sportspeople from Miami
Sportspeople from Nottingham